Thomas Gregory Huff (September 27, 1932 – April 14, 2013) was an American businessman and politician who served as a member of the Washington House of Representatives, representing the 26th district from 1995 to 2001.

Biography
Born and raised in Mandan, North Dakota, Huff attended local public schools and graduated from Sumner High School. He attended college at the University of Puget Sound and Knapp College.

Huff made a business career in Washington State, where he became an executive for Sears, a major retailer and catalog company. He became interested in politics, joining the Republican Party. Elected in 1994 to the Washington House of Representatives, he served from 1995 to 2000 representing Gig Harbor.

References

External links

1933 births
2013 deaths
People from Mandan, North Dakota
People from Gig Harbor, Washington
University of Puget Sound alumni
Businesspeople from Washington (state)
Republican Party members of the Washington House of Representatives
20th-century American businesspeople